Eunice Odio (pseudonym, Catalina Mariel; San José, Costa Rica, October 18, 1919 – Mexico City, Mexico, March 23, 1974) was a notable Latin American poet. She wrote articles, essays, reflections, letters, short stories and children's literature. Odio worked as a journalist and she also taught English and French. She left an extensive body of poetic work. In addition to Costa Rica and Mexico, she also lived in Cuba, Guatemala, Nicaragua, and the United States. She married the painter Rodolfo Zanabria in order to gain Mexican citizenship.

Selected works 
 Los elementos terrestres, 1948
 Zona en territorio del alba, 1953 
 El tránsito de fuego, 1957
 El rastro de las mariposas, 1970 
 Territorio del alba y otros poemas, 1974
 Eunice Odio Antología, 1975

Translations 
 The Fire's Journey, Part I: Integration of the Parents (Tavern Books, 2013) 
 The Fire's Journey, Part II: Creation of Myself (Tavern Books, 2015)
 The Fire's Journey, Part III: The Cathedral's Work (Tavern Books, 2018)
 The Fire's Journey, Part IV: The Return (Tavern Books, 2019)

References

External links 

 Eunice Odio recorded at the Library of Congress for the Hispanic Division’s audio literary archive on December 19, 1961
Toward a Poetry & Poetics of the Americas (23): Eunice Odio, from The Fire’s Journey. Poems and Poetics, 27 December 2019

1919 births
1974 deaths
Writers from San José, Costa Rica
20th-century Costa Rican poets
Costa Rican women short story writers
Costa Rican short story writers
Costa Rican journalists
Costa Rican people of Italian descent
Costa Rican emigrants to Mexico
Costa Rican expatriates in Cuba
Costa Rican expatriates in the United States
Costa Rican expatriates in Guatemala
Costa Rican expatriates in Nicaragua
20th-century women writers
Costa Rican women journalists
Costa Rican women poets
Costa Rican women essayists
Women educators
20th-century translators
20th-century short story writers
20th-century essayists
20th-century Costa Rican writers
20th-century Costa Rican women writers
Costa Rican Theosophists
20th-century journalists